Malča is a village located in the Niš city municipality of Pantelej, Serbia. As of 2011 census, it has a population of 1,030 inhabitants.

References

Populated places in Nišava District